William John Vukovich Sr. (born Vaso Vučurović; December 13, 1918 – May 30, 1955) was an American automobile racing driver of Serbian origin. He won the 1953 and 1954 Indianapolis 500, plus two more American Automobile Association National Championship races, and died while leading the 1955 Indianapolis 500. Several drivers of his generation have referred to Vukovich as the greatest ever in American motorsport.

He was nicknamed "Vuky" (VOO-kee), or "The Mad Russian" (despite having Serbian ancestry) for his driving style, and "The Silent Serb" for his demeanor. He is generally considered one of the best racing drivers of his generation, and is the only driver to lead the most laps in three consecutive Indy 500s.

Racer

Midget car
Before he began Indy racing, Vukovich drove midget cars for the Edelbrock dirt track racing team. He raced on the West Coast of the United States in the URA, and won the series' 1945 and 1946 midget car championships. Vukovich won the 1948 Turkey Night Grand Prix at Gilmore Stadium, and six of the last eight races at the stadium track before it was closed for good.  He won the 1950 AAA National Midget championship. Vukovich was known for racing midgets powered by Drake engines. The Drake was a Harley V-twin with specially built Drake water cooled heads. His last Drake powered midget was a Kurtis-Kraft that was built by Ed and Zeke Justice, the Justice Brothers, in their shop in Glendale from a Kurtis kit. Previous to this car Vukovich drove a "Frame Rail" midget that was also powered by a Drake engine.

Indianapolis 500
In 1952, his sophomore year in the Indianapolis Motor Speedway's 500-Mile Race, he quickly moved up from his starting position in the middle of the third row to take the lead, and led 150 laps in dominant fashion before suffering steering failure on the 192nd of the 200 laps.  He returned to win the race in consecutive years, 1953 and 1954. He led an astounding 71.7% of laps that he drove in competition at the track, and remains the only driver ever to lead the most laps in the race three consecutive years.

Death at Indianapolis
Vukovich was killed in a chain-reaction crash while holding a 17-second lead on the 57th lap of the 1955 Indianapolis 500. He was exiting the second turn, trailing three slower cars—driven by Rodger Ward, Al Keller, and Johnny Boyd—when Ward's car hit the backstretch outer wall and flipped, resting in the middle of the track as a result of a broken axle. Keller, swerving into the infield to avoid Ward, lost control and slid back onto the track, striking Boyd's car and pushing it into Vukovich's path. After his car went over the outside wall and become airborne, it cartwheeled through the air multiple times landing on top of a group of parked cars before coming to rest upside down and bursting into flames. The cockpit side of his car struck a low bridge near Turn 2 when it was airborne. Boyd's car also flipped over and landed upside down as well. As the car burned, Ed Elisian stopped his undamaged car and raced towards Vukovich in an attempt to save him. It did not matter; Vukovich had perished instantly. He had been partially decapitated upon his car's impact with the low bridge. Two spectators were also injured when Vukovich's car landed on their Jeep.

Vukovich was the second defending Indy 500 champion to die during the race, following Floyd Roberts in 1939, and the only former winner to have been killed while leading. Roberts' car was also thrown over the backstretch fence after exiting the second turn in his fatal accident. Since the 1955 race was counted as part of the Formula One World Championship, Vukovich is also the first driver to be killed during a World Championship race.

Lifetime achievement awards
Vukovich was inducted into the Indianapolis Motor Speedway Hall of Fame in 1972.
He was inducted into the International Motorsports Hall of Fame in 1991.
He was inducted in the Motorsports Hall of Fame of America in 1992.
He was inducted in the National Midget Auto Racing Hall of Fame in 1990.

Family
His son, Bill Vukovich II, and his grandson, Bill Vukovich III, also competed in the Indianapolis 500, with Vukovich II taking second in 1973, and Vukovich III being named Rookie of the Year in 1988. Vukovich III died on November 25, 1990, in a crash during practice for a CRA race at Mesa Marin Raceway, in Bakersfield, California.

World Championship career summary
The Indianapolis 500 was part of the World Drivers' Championship (which later became the FIA Formula 1 World championship) from 1950 through 1960. Drivers competing at Indy during those years were credited with World Championship points and participation. Vukovich participated in 5 F1 World Championship races. He started on the pole once, won 2 races, set 3 fastest lead laps, and finished on the podium twice. He accumulated a total of 19 championship points.

Motorsports career results

Complete AAA Championship Car results

Indianapolis 500 results

Complete Formula One World Championship results
(key) (Races in bold indicate pole position; races in italics indicate fastest lap)

See also
List of fatalities at Indianapolis

References

External links
A Report On The Accident That Killed Bill Vukovich In The 1955 Indianapolis 500-Mile-Race
The Greatest 33

1918 births
1955 deaths
American people of Serbian descent
American racing drivers
Filmed deaths in motorsport
Indianapolis 500 drivers
Indianapolis 500 polesitters
Indianapolis 500 Rookies of the Year
Indianapolis 500 winners
International Motorsports Hall of Fame inductees
Sportspeople from Fresno, California
Racing drivers from Fresno, California
Racing drivers from California
Racing drivers who died while racing
Sports deaths in Indiana
AAA Championship Car drivers
World Sportscar Championship drivers
Formula One race winners
Carrera Panamericana drivers